The following is a list of Dadaists. It includes those who are generally classed into different movements, but have created some Dadaist works.

A - D 
 Pierre Albert-Birot (22 April 1876 – 25 July 1967) 
 Guillaume Apollinaire (August 26, 1880 – November 9, 1918)
 Louis Aragon (October 3, 1897 – December 24, 1982)
 Jean Arp (September 16, 1886 – June 7, 1966)
 Alice Bailly (February 25, 1872 – January 1 1938)
 Johannes Baader (June 22, 1875 – January 15, 1955)
 Johannes Theodor Baargeld (October 9, 1892 – August 16 or 17, 1927)
 Hugo Ball (February 22, 1886 – September 14, 1927)
 André Breton (February 19, 1896 – September 28, 1966)
 Gino Cantarelli (1899 – 1950)
 John Covert (painter) (May 22, 1887 – November 1918?)
 Jean Crotti (April 24, 1878 – January 30, 1958)
 Theo van Doesburg (August 30, 1883 – March 7, 1931)
 Marcel Duchamp (July 28, 1887 – October 2, 1968)

E - H 
 Viking Eggeling (October 21, 1880 – May 19, 1925)
 Paul Éluard (December 14, 1895 – November 18, 1952)
 Max Ernst (April 2, 1891 – April 1, 1976)
 Julius Evola (May 19, 1898 – June 11, 1974)
 Lyonel Feininger (July 17, 1871 – January 13, 1956)
 Elsa von Freytag-Loringhoven (12 July 1874 – 15 December 1927)
 George Grosz (July 26, 1893 – July 6, 1959)
 Raoul Hausmann (July 12, 1886 – February 1, 1971)
 John Heartfield (June 19, 1891 – April 26, 1968)
 Emmy Hennings (February 17, 1885 – August 10, 1948)
 Wieland Herzfelde (April 11, 1896 – November 23, 1988)
 Hannah Höch (November 1, 1889 – May 31, 1978)
 Richard Huelsenbeck (April 23, 1892 – April 30, 1974)
 Barry Humphries (17 February 1934 –)

I - R 
 Marcel Janco (May 24, 1895 – April 21, 1984)
 Tsuji Jun (October 4, 1884 – November 24, 1944)
 Yves Klein (April 28, 1928 – June 6, 1962) (see Neo-Dada) 
 Hans Leybold (April 2, 1892 – September 8, 1914) 
 Filippo Tommaso Marinetti (December 22, 1876 – December 2, 1944)
 Agnes Elizabeth Ernst Meyer (1887 – 1970)
 Pranas Morkūnas (October 9, 1900 – December 28, 1941)
 Clément Pansaers (May 1, 1885, – October 31, 1922)
 Francis Picabia (January 28, 1879 – November 30, 1953) 
 Man Ray (August 27, 1890 – November 18, 1976)
 Georges Ribemont-Dessaignes (June 19, 1884 – July 9, 1974)
 Hans Richter (April 6, 1888 – February 1, 1976)

S - Z 
 Yi Sang (September 14, 1910 – April 17, 1937)
 Christian Schad (August 21, 1894 – February 25, 1982) 
 Rudolf Schlichter (December 6, 1890 – May 3, 1955)
 Kurt Schwitters (June 20, 1887 – January 8, 1948) 
 Walter Serner (January 15, 1889 – August 1942)
 Philippe Soupault (August 2, 1897 – March 12, 1990) 
 Sophie Taeuber (January 19, 1889 – January 13, 1943)
 Tristan Tzara (April 4 or 16, 1896 – December 25, 1963)
 Louis Norton-Varése (20 November 1890 – 1 July 1989)
 Beatrice Wood (March 3, 1893 – March 12, 1998)
 Fried-Hardy Worm  (February 8, 1896, Berlin – August 29, 1973)
 Marius de Zayas (March 13, 1880 – January 10, 1961)

Dadaists